Jack Erwin Spikes (born February 5, 1937) is a former American football running back and placekicker.  He played in the American Football League (NFL)  for the Dallas Texans/Kansas City Chiefs, Houston Oilers, and the Buffalo Bills.  He played college football at Texas Christian University (TCU).

Spikes played a key role in professional football's longest championship game, the 1962 American Football League Championship game between the Texans and the Houston Oilers.  Spikes' teammate Bill Hull intercepted the Oilers' George Blanda late in the first overtime. Hull's interception allowed the Texans to start the second overtime with two powerful runs by Spikes, to move the ball to the Oilers' 25-yard line, and Tommy Brooker kicked a field goal to give the Texans the win, 20–17.

See also
 List of American Football League players

References

1937 births
Living people
American football running backs
Buffalo Bills players
Dallas Texans (AFL) players
Houston Oilers players
Kansas City Chiefs players
TCU Horned Frogs football players
People from Big Spring, Texas
American Football League players